German submarine U-433 was a Type VIIC U-boat      built for Nazi Germany's Kriegsmarine for service during World War II.
She was laid down on 4 January 1940 by Schichau-Werke, Danzig  as yard number 1474, launched on 15 March 1941 and commissioned on 24 May 1941 under Oberleutnant zur See Hans Ey.

Design
German Type VIIC submarines were preceded by the shorter Type VIIB submarines. U-433 had a displacement of  when at the surface and  while submerged. She had two shafts and two  propellers.

U-433 was fitted with five  torpedo tubes (four fitted at the bow and one at the stern), fourteen torpedoes, one  SK C/35 naval gun, 220 rounds, and a  C/30 anti-aircraft gun. The boat had a complement of between forty-four and sixty.

Service history
The boat's career began with training at 3rd U-boat Flotilla on 24 May 1941, and continuing with active service on 1 August 1941 as part of the 3rd Flotilla for the remainder of her service.

Wolfpacks
U-433 took part in two wolfpacks, namely:
 Markgraf (28 August – 16 September 1941)
 Arnauld (8 – 16 November 1941)

Fate
U-433 was sunk on 16 November 1941 in the Mediterranean E of Gibraltar, in position , by depth charges and gunfire from Royal Navy corvette . There were 6 dead and 38 survivors.

Summary of raiding history

See also
 Mediterranean U-boat Campaign (World War II)

References

Bibliography

External links

German Type VIIC submarines
1941 ships
U-boats commissioned in 1941
U-boats sunk in 1941
U-boats sunk by depth charges
U-boats sunk by British warships
World War II shipwrecks in the Mediterranean Sea
World War II submarines of Germany
Ships built in Danzig
Maritime incidents in November 1941
Ships built by Schichau